AOC normally refers to Alexandria Ocasio-Cortez (born 1989), a Democratic member of the United States House of Representatives.

AOC or AoC may also refer to:

People

 (see primary topic listed above)
 Alex Oxlade-Chamberlain (born 1993), English footballer

Aeronautics
 Aeronautical operational control, communications between an aircraft and ground operators
 Air Operations Center, a command center operated by the United States Air Force
 Air officer commanding, a title in some air forces
 Air operator's certificate
 Aircraft Operating Company, a former British aerial photography company
 Aircraft Operations Center, a part of the US NOAA
 Aviation Officer Candidate, a rank at the U.S. Navy Officer Candidate School
 Leipzig–Altenburg Airport's IATA code

Law
 , a protected designation of origin for French agricultural products
  (Switzerland), a protected designation of origin for Swiss wines

Organizations
 AOC International (formerly Admiral Overseas Corporation), an electronics company in Taiwan
 Adelaide Ornithologists Club, a club in Australia
 Akan Orthography Committee, a committee for the Akan language
  or Worker–Peasant Alliance, a front of the Communist Party of Portugal
 Alliance of Civilizations, a UN anti-extremism organization
 Architect of the Capitol, a US agency
 Army Ordnance Corps (United Kingdom), the predecessor of the Royal Army Ordnance Corps of the British Army
 Arts Orange County, an arts council in California
 Association of Colleges, an association in the UK
 Association of Old Crows, an electronic warfare defense organization in the US
 Australian Olympic Committee

Science and technology
 Active optical cable, a cable used in 10 Gigabit Ethernet
 Advice of Charge, a part of the mobile GSM services standard
 Antibody-oligonucleotide conjugate

Other uses
 Anglican Orthodox Church, a Continuing Anglican denomination in the United States
Atatürk Orman Çiftliği, a public recreational farming area in Turkey
 Attestation of Compliance, a component of the self-assessment questionnaire in the Payment Card Industry Data Security Standard

See also 
 AOC3, a human gene